Laemostenus is a genus of ground beetles present on all continents on Earth, except Antarctica.

There are nearly 200 species in the genus, divided into several subgenera. Beetles of the genus are about 8 to 28 millimeters long. Many are dark in color with a blue or purple sheen. Others, especially subterranean and cave-dwelling species, are depigmented, much lighter in color, with reduced eyes.

Selected subgenera and species

Laemostenus (Actenipus)
Laemostenus acutangulus
Laemostenus angustatus
Laemostenus carinatus
Laemostenus caussolensis
Laemostenus dubaulti
Laemostenus elegans
Laemostenus ginellae
Laemostenus gobbii
Laemostenus krueperi
Laemostenus latialis
Laemostenus macropus
Laemostenus meaillensis
Laemostenus oblongus
Laemostenus obtusus
Laemostenus peloponnesiacus
Laemostenus pippiai
Laemostenus plasoni
Laemostenus thessalicus
Laemostenus (Antisphodrus)
Laemostenus andalusiacus
Laemostenus barrancoi
Laemostenus bermejae
Laemostenus beroni
Laemostenus casalei
Laemostenus cavicola
Laemostenus cazorlensis
Laemostenus elongatus
Laemostenus giachinoi
Laemostenus insubricus
Laemostenus jailensis
Laemostenus lassallei
Laemostenus ledereri
Laemostenus leonhardi
Laemostenus levantinus
Laemostenus monguzzii
Laemostenus navaricus
Laemostenus peleus
Laemostenus reissi
Laemostenus schreibersii
Laemostenus seguranus
Laemostenus (Ceuthosthenes)
Laemostenus mauritanicus
Laemostenus (Eucryptotrichus)
Laemostenus pinicola
Laemostenus (Laemostenus)
Laemostenus alpinus
Laemostenus barbarus
Laemostenus complanatus
Laemostenus dalmatinus
Laemostenus janthinus
Laemostenus magellensis
Laemostenus quadricollis
Laemostenus venustus
Laemostenus (Pristonychus)
Laemostenus algerinus
Laemostenus andreevi
Laemostenus baeticus
Laemostenus cimmerius
Laemostenus conspicuus
Laemostenus euxinicus
Laemostenus sericeus
Laemostenus stussineri
Laemostenus terricola
Laemostenus tichyi
Laemostenus (Sphodroides)
Laemostenus cordicollis
Laemostenus picicornis

References

External links

Laemostenus at Fauna Europaea

 
Taxa named by Franco Andrea Bonelli